The 23rd Independent Spirit Awards, honoring the best in independent filmmaking for 2007, were announced on February 23, 2008.  It was hosted by Rainn Wilson.

Winners and nominees 

{| class="wikitable"
!Best Feature
!Best Director
|-
|Juno

The Diving Bell and the Butterfly
I'm Not There
A Mighty Heart
Paranoid Park
|Julian Schnabel – The Diving Bell and the Butterfly

Todd Haynes – I'm Not There
Tamara Jenkins – The Savages
Jason Reitman – Juno
Gus Van Sant – Paranoid Park
|-
!Best Male Lead
!Best Female Lead
|-
|Philip Seymour Hoffman – The Savages

Pedro Castaneda – August Evening
Don Cheadle – Talk to Me
Frank Langella – Starting Out in the Evening
Tony Leung – Lust, Caution
|Elliot Page – Juno

Angelina Jolie – A Mighty Heart
Sienna Miller – Interview
Parker Posey – Broken English
Tang Wei – Lust, Caution
|-
!Best Supporting Male
!Best Supporting Female
|-
|Chiwetel Ejiofor – Talk to Me

Marcus Carl Franklin – I'm Not There
Kene Holliday – Great World of Sound
Irrfan Khan – The Namesake
Steve Zahn – Rescue Dawn
|Cate Blanchett – I'm Not There

Anna Kendrick – Rocket Science
Jennifer Jason Leigh – Margot at the Wedding
Tamara Podemski – Four Sheets to the Wind
Marisa Tomei – Before the Devil Knows You're Dead
|-
!Best Screenplay
!Best First Screenplay
|-
|The Savages – Tamara JenkinsThe Diving Bell and the Butterfly – Ronald Harwood
Starting Out in the Evening – Fred Parnes and Andrew Wagner
Waitress – Adrienne Shelly
Year of the Dog – Mike White
|Juno – Diablo CodyBefore the Devil Knows You're Dead – Kelly Masterson
Broken English – Zoe Cassavetes
A Mighty Heart – John Orloff
Rocket Science – Jeffrey Blitz
|-
!Best First Feature
!Best Documentary
|-
|The Lookout

2 Days in Paris
Great World of Sound
Rocket Science
Vanaja
|Crazy Love

Lake of Fire
Manufactured Landscapes
The Monastery
The Prisoner or: How I Planned to Kill Tony Blair
|-
!Best Cinematography
!Best Foreign Film
|-
|The Diving Bell and the Butterfly – Janusz KamińskiLust, Caution – Rodrigo Prieto
The Savages – W. Mott Hupfel III
Vanaja – Milton Kam
Youth Without Youth – Mihai Mălaimare Jr.
| Once • Ireland4 Months, 3 Weeks and 2 Days • Romania
The Band's Visit • Israel
Lady Chatterley • France
Persepolis • France
|}

 Films with multiple nominations and awards 

 Special awards 

John Cassavetes AwardAugust Evening
Owl and the Sparrow
The Pool
Quiet City
Shotgun Stories

Truer Than Fiction Award
The Unforeseen
Helvetica
Running Stumbled

Producers Award
Neil Kopp – Paranoid Park and Old Joy
Alexis Ferris – Cthulhu and Police Beat
Anne Clements – Ping Pong Playa and Quinceañera

Someone to Watch Award
Ramin Bahrani – Chop Shop
Ronald Bronstein – Frownland
Lee Isaac Chung – Munyurangabo

Robert Altman Award
(*Note: This award is given to its director, casting director, and ensemble cast)

I'm Not There (Todd Haynes, Laura Rosenthal, Christian Bale, Cate Blanchett, Marcus Carl Franklin, Charlotte Gainsbourg, Richard Gere, Bruce Greenwood, Heath Ledger and Ben Whishaw)

External links 
2007 Spirit Awards at IMDb
Full official show on YouTube

References

2007
Independent Spirit Awards